Vojtěch Rödl (born 1 April 1949) is a  Czech American mathematician, Samuel Candler Dobbs Professor at Emory University. He is noted for his contributions mainly to combinatorics  having authored hundreds of research papers.

Academic Background
Rödl obtained his PhD from the School of Mathematics and Physics at Charles University in 1976. His supervisor was  Zdeněk Hedrlín. 

From 1973 to 1987 he lectured at the School of Nuclear and Physical Engineering at the Czech Technical University in Prague. He has held visiting positions in various institutions including McMaster University, University of Waterloo,  Bell Laboratories,  Microsoft, Charles University, Mathematical Institute of the Czech Academy of Science, Bielefeld University, as well as at  Humboldt University in Berlin. 

He serves on the editorial board of several international journals. 

He has given lectures at many conferences, including plenary address in 2014 at the International Congress of Mathematicians in Seoul and an invited lecture in 1990 at the International Congress of Mathematicians in Kyoto.

He has several joint publications with Paul Erdős, and so has Erdős number one.

Research
Rödl has published more than four hundred papers, mostly in combinatorics. He is mostly known for his contributions to Ramsey theory, extremal problems, and probabilistic combinatorics.

Awards
 1977 – Silver medal of the Union of Czechoslovak Mathematicians and Physicists
 1985 – Czechoslovak State prize (jointly with Nesetril)
 1996 – Humboldt Prize
 2005 – Felber Medal (Czech Technical University)
 2011 – Bolzano Medal (Czech Academy of Science)
 2012 – Polya Prize (jointly with M.Schacht)
 2013 – Neuron Prize
 2003 and 2017 Honorary doctorate (Technical University of Liberec and Czech Technical University Prague respectively)

In 1983 with P. Frankl he solved a 1000$ problem of Paul Erdős. Since 2010 Rödl has been a Foreign Fellow of the Czech Learned Society.

Books
  2012 pbk reprint

See also
Packing in a hypergraph
Frankl–Rödl graph
Hypergraph removal lemma

References

External links
 
 

20th-century American mathematicians
21st-century American mathematicians
Czech mathematicians
Combinatorialists
Charles University alumni
1949 births
Living people